Álvaro Jaén Barbado (Madrid, Spain, 9 December 1981) is a Spanish politician, deputy in the Assembly of Extremadura and member of Podemos.

Biography 

Son of Extremaduran emigrants in Madrid, Álvaro Jaén graduated in Political Science by the Complutense University of Madrid.

Before joining Podemos, he has had numerous jobs like agricultural day laborer or substitute teacher. In February 2015, he was elected as Secretary-General of Podemos in Extremadura by the party’s bases, likewise being designated in April as presidential candidate of the Junta of Extremadura.

In November 2016, he was reelected Secretary-General of Podemos-Extremadura.

References 

1981 births
Complutense University of Madrid alumni
Living people
People from Madrid
Podemos (Spanish political party) politicians
Spanish political scientists
Members of the 9th Assembly of Extremadura
Members of the 10th Assembly of Extremadura